The history of East German football is complex, and that of its clubs particularly so. After World War II, the occupying Allies disbanded most German organisations, including sports clubs. 

While some clubs were re-formed, others were not, and many that emerged had been renamed, merged with their neighbours, or even split. The instability continued throughout the East German era, with clubs being moved to new towns, and with very frequent name-changes, Soviet-sounding names like Dynamo and Lokomotive replacing more traditional names. 

After re-unification, many clubs reverted to their pre-East German names, but some stuck with them, and others have changed back again. This page lists all prominent East German clubs, along with their original name, their present-day name, and a list of name changes and mergers that they underwent.

° Football clubs (FC), which were founded 1965-66 as centers of high-level football in the GDR.
°° SG Dynamo Dresden was a sports community with FC status.

See also
All-time DDR-Oberliga table
List of football clubs in Germany

Footnotes

References
 
 

 
Germany, East
Football clubs, East
East